Edward J. Dowling (born December 8, 1875 in New York City) was an American lawyer and politician from New York.

Life
Dowling was a member of the New York State Senate (19th D.) from 1917 to 1920, sitting in the 140th, 141st, 142nd and 143rd New York State Legislatures.

In April 1934, Dowling pleaded guilty to second-degree grand larceny, and—after making restitution—received a suspended sentence for having stolen $20,000 in Liberty bonds from the estate of two small children.

References

Sources
 New York Red Book (1920; pg. 147)

1875 births
Year of death missing
Democratic Party New York (state) state senators
People from Manhattan
American people convicted of theft